Grevillea striata, commonly known as beefwood or silver honeysuckle, is a species of flowering plant in the family Proteaceae and is endemic to continental Australia. It is a shrub or tree with linear leaves and white to cream-colured or pale yellow flowers. Other common names for this species include western beefwood, beef oak and beef silky oak.

Description
The lower surface of the leaves has 5 to 13 prominent striations.

Taxonomy and naming
Grevillea striata was first formally described in 1810 by botanist Robert Brown in the Transactions of the Linnean Society of London, from specimens collected near the coast of the Gulf of Carpentaria. The specific epithet (striata) means "striate", referring to the veins on the lower surface of the leaves.

This species is known as beefwood due to the intense red colour of its heartwood.

Distribution and habitat
Beefwood grows in woodland, shrubland and spinifex communities in a range of soil types. It occurs in all mainland states except Victoria. 

Some specimens are long-lived. A tree still stands bearing an inscription in memory of James Poole, a member of Charles Sturt's expedition in 1845, although the tree must have been mature at the time of carving. Poole, having died of scurvy, was buried near a beefwood tree at Preservation Creek near Milparinka, and an inscription "JP 1845" was carved into the tree.

Uses

Indigenous uses
Aboriginal people used resin from the tree to stick flints to their cutting tools. They also reportedly used charcoal from the tree to treat wounds and promote healing.

Building material
Due to its durability and the fact that it splits readily, the timber was used by early settlers for fence posts, shingles and flooring.

References

striata
Trees of Australia
Proteales of Australia
Flora of New South Wales
Flora of the Northern Territory
Flora of Queensland
Flora of South Australia
Eudicots of Western Australia
Taxa named by Robert Brown (botanist, born 1773)
Plants described in 1810
Drought-tolerant trees